Peter Johnson may refer to:

Sports
 Peter Randall Johnson (1880–1959), Somerset cricketer
 Peter Johnson (cricketer, born 1926) (1926–2017), English cricketer and Royal Navy officer
 Peter Johnson (rugby union) (1937–2016), Australian national representative rugby union player
 Peter Johnson (ice hockey, born 1946), retired British ice hockey player
 Peter Johnson (Nottinghamshire cricketer) (born 1949), English cricketer
 Peter Johnson (sports executive) (born 1950), American sports agent and business executive
 Peter Johnson (footballer, born 1954), English football player
 Peter Johnson (skier) (born 1956), American mogul skier
 Peter Johnson (footballer, born 1958), English football player
 Peter Johnson (ice hockey coach) (born 1959), American ice hockey coach and scout
 Peter Bonu Johnson (1963–2019), Gambian football player and manager

Other
 Peter Johnson (pirate) (died 1672), Dutch pirate active in the Caribbean
 Peter Johnson (Medal of Honor) (1857–1943), United States Navy sailor and Medal of Honor recipient
 Peter Johnson (RAF officer) (1908–1999), Royal Air Force officer and author
 Peter Johnson Sr. (1921–2012), American lawyer
 Peter Johnson (architect) (1923–2003), Australian architect and academic administrator
 Leslie Peter Johnson (1930–2016), British medievalist
 Peter Johnson (businessman) (born 1939), formerly involved with Everton FC
 Peter Johnson (Australian politician) (born 1943), Australian politician
 Peter Johnson (poet) (born 1951), American poet, and novelist
 Peter Johnson (entrepreneur) (born 1956), British academic and entrepreneur
 Peter Johnson (railway historian) (fl. 1974–2017), British railway author and historian
 Peter M. Johnson (born 1966), a General Authority Seventy of The Church of Jesus Christ of Latter-day Saints
 Peter Johnson (Maine politician) (fl. 2006–2014), American politician from Maine

See also
 Pete Johnson (disambiguation)
 Peter Johnsen (born 1950), Bradley University Provost and Vice President for Academic Affairs
 Peter Johnston (disambiguation)